The Assistant Secretary of State for Political-Military Affairs is a position within the U.S. Department of State that manages the Bureau of Political-Military Affairs, charged with linking the Department of Defense and the Department of State by providing policy in the areas of international security, security assistance, military operations, defense strategy and policy, military use of space, and defense trade. The Assistant Secretary of State for Political-Military Affairs reports to the Under Secretary of State for Arms Control and International Security Affairs.

When the Department of State originally established the Bureau of Politico-Military Affairs on September 18, 1969, the bureau had replaced a special component for politico-military affairs that had served under the Deputy Under Secretary of State for Political Affairs since 1960. The head of the Bureau had the title of Director of the Bureau of Politico-Military Affairs, and was designated by the Secretary of State, but still held rank equivalent to Assistant Secretary. Later, the director became appointed by the President, subject to the advice and consent of the Senate, and the title of the head of the Bureau was changed to Assistant Secretary on April 14, 1986.

List of directors of the Bureau of Political-Military Affairs, 1969–1985

List of Assistant Secretaries of State for Political-Military Affairs, 1986–present

References